Elite Model Look (formerly known as Look of the Year from 1983 to 1995) is a yearly fashion modeling event held by Elite Model Management, an international model management group. It is used to discover and launch female fashion models in the international fashion marketplace, like the similar Ford Models' Supermodel of the World contest. Each year the contest attracts some 350,000 participants from roughly 70 countries in the world, with castings held in over 800 cities. Contestants, between the ages of 14 and 26, compete in local contests for a chance to represent their country in the world final.

Notable past contestants include Laurie Holden, Alessandra Ambrosio, Ana Beatriz Barros, Cindy Crawford, Helena Christensen, Dayana Mendoza, Melania Trump, Olga Kurylenko, Diane Kruger, Esther Cañadas, Fernanda Tavares, Frederique van der Wal, Gisele Bündchen, Inés Rivero, Isabeli Fontana, Kate Dillon Levin, Lara Stone, Juana Burga, Petra Němcová, Stephanie Seymour, Tatjana Patitz, Ujjwala Raut, Manasvi Mamgai, Azra Akin, Miriam Odemba and Rolene Strauss.

From 1996 to 1999 the United States finals were recorded to make a television documentary special called The Making of a Supermodel, which aired on E! Entertainment Television. Online, a streaming television documentary titled Elite New Face premiered on Hulu on November 19, 2012. The series reviewed the 2011 contest, and followed the 2012 contest beginning from the regional castings all the way to the world final and the announcement of the winner. A second season following the 2013 event was also created.

The contest
The search is open to beginning models, with the contest's mission stated as being "providing the opportunity for young girls to enter the fashion world, become models and go on to have fabulous careers" and "to discover the new talents who will become the next top models."

Contestants are required to be between the ages of 14 and 26 years. Females should meet a minimum height requirement of 1.72 meters, or 5'8". Males should meet a minimum height requirement of 1.88 meters, or 6'2". Until 2014, Males were only allowed to participate national finals, with females competing in the world final.

Each country taking part in the contest selects semi-finalists in various cities who compete to become national finalists. The winners of each national contest compete together in the world final. The winners are selected based on their photogenic abilities, personality, natural beauty, and potential to fit into current fashion trends. The world final lasts two weeks, during which the finalists participate in various workshops. These include highlighting natural beauty with make-up and hair professionals, photo shoots, rehearsals for the final show, and individual interviews with members of the jury and Elite's agents.

During the final show fifteen winners are selected by a jury, and are awarded worldwide contracts with Elite Model Management. The top three contestants are offered contracts with a guaranteed remuneration.

Titleholders

 No event was held in 1984 or 2006.

Participating nations and regions
The following is a list of countries or regions that have participated in the Elite Model Look contest

North America
 
 
 

Central America
 
 

Caribbean
 
 
 
 
 
 
 
 
 

South America
 
 
 
 
 
 
 
 
 
 

Europe
 
 
 
 
 
 
 
 
 
 
 
 
 
 
 
 
 
 
 
 
 
 
 
 
 
 
 
 
 
 
 
 
 
 
 
 
 
 
 
 

Africa
 
 
 
 
 
 
 
 
 
 
 
 
 
 
 
 
 
 
 
 

Asia
 
 
 
 
 
 
 
 
 
 
 
 
 
 
 
 
 

Oceania

Hosts

See also
 Elite Model Look Chile
 Elite Model Look India
 Elite Model Look Serbia
 Elite Model Look Vietnam 
 Elite Model Management
 Ford Models Supermodel of the World
 Got Talent
 Miss Supertalent
 American Idol
 Miss Universe

References

External links
 Official site
 The YouTube channel of Elite Model Look International
 Elite New Face series on Hulu

Modeling competitions
Fashion events in France
Recurring events established in 1983